Hampden Firehouse is a historic fire station located at Reading, Berks County, Pennsylvania.  It was built in 1887, and is a two-story, brick building on a granite foundation in the Renaissance Revival style. It was designed by noted Philadelphia architect Edwin Forrest Durang (1829 – 1911).  It features a double pedimented roof influenced by the Greek Revival style and round arched windows.

It was listed on the National Register of Historic Places in 1982.

References

Buildings and structures in Reading, Pennsylvania
Renaissance Revival architecture in Pennsylvania
Victorian architecture in Pennsylvania
Fire stations completed in 1887
Government buildings completed in 1887
Defunct fire stations in Pennsylvania
Fire stations on the National Register of Historic Places in Pennsylvania
National Register of Historic Places in Reading, Pennsylvania
1887 establishments in Pennsylvania